Fawn is an unincorporated community in Dent County, in the U.S. state of Missouri.

History
A post office called Fawn was established in 1894, and remained in operation until 1908. The area originally was a hunting ground of deer, hence the name Fawn.

References

Unincorporated communities in Dent County, Missouri
Unincorporated communities in Missouri